Rutland County Council is a council in England.

Rutland County Council may also refer to:
 
Rutland County Council (Vermont), United States
Rutland Scout County (The Scout Association), England